Pachyodes jianfengensis is a moth of the family Geometridae first described by Hong-Xiang Han and Da-Yong Xue in 2008. It is found in Hainan, China.

References

Moths described in 2008
Pseudoterpnini
Moths of Asia